The Marvelettes a.k.a. The Pink Album is a 1967 album by American vocal group The Marvelettes, also their seventh LP.

Overview
Recording for The Pink Album began in 1966. While Smokey Robinson handled much of the production, there is also production from James Dean and William Weatherspoon, who would provide material for The Marvelettes' next album. Producers felt that the group needed to offer a sound more mature and developed that contrasted their previous recordings. This album contains only two singles: "The Hunter Gets Captured by the Game" (13 US, No. 2 R&B) which was written and produced by Robinson, and its follow-up, a remake of Ruby & the Romantics' "When You're Young and in Love" (No. 23 US, No. 9 R&B, No. 13 UK) which was the group's only single to reach UK charts. The Marvelettes topped out at No. 129 in the US and was more successful on the R&B chart, at No. 13.

Track listing
Superscript denotes lead singer: (a) Wanda Young; (b) Gladys Horton

Side 1
"Barefootin'" (Robert Parker) (Robert Parker cover) a
"Message to Michael" (Burt Bacharach, Hal David) (Dionne Warwick cover) b
"The Hunter Gets Captured by the Game" (William Robinson) a
"When You're Young and in Love" (Van McCoy) (Ruby & The Romantics cover) a
"I Know Better" (R. Dean Taylor, Norman Whitfield) b
"I Can't Turn Around" (Frank Wilson) a

Side 2
"He Was Really Sayin' Somethin'" (Eddie Holland, William Stevenson, Norman Whitfield) (The Velvelettes cover) b
"The Day You Take One (You Have to Take the Other)" (William Robinson) a
"When I Need You" (Morris Broadnax, Clarence Paul) a
"Keep Off, No Trespassing" (Johnny Bristol, Robert Gordy) b, a
"Tonight Was Made for Love" (Thomas Jones, Robert Staunton) b
"I Need Someone" (James Dean, William Weatherspoon) b

Personnel
Gladys Horton – lead vocals (where indicated), backing vocals (side 1, tracks 1, 3, 4 and 6; side 2 tracks 2 and 3)
Wanda Young – lead vocals (where indicated), backing vocals (side 1, track 2 and 5; side 2, tracks 1, 4, 5, 6)
Katherine Anderson – backing vocals
The Andantes – backing vocals (side 1, tracks 2–6; side 2, tracks 2–6)
Smokey Robinson – producer
Norman Whitfield – producer
Brian Holland – producer
Lamont Dozier – producer
James Dean – producer
William Weatherspoon – producer
The Funk Brothers – instrumentation (all tracks)
Detroit Symphony Orchestra – instrumentation (side 1, tracks 4 and 5; side 2, tracks 4 and 5)

Singles history
"The Hunter Gets Captured by the Game" ( 13 US) (No. 2 R&B)
"When You're Young and in Love" (No. 23 US) (No. 9 R&B) (No. 13 UK)

References

1967 albums
The Marvelettes albums
Tamla Records albums
Albums produced by Smokey Robinson
Albums produced by Brian Holland
Albums produced by Norman Whitfield
Albums produced by Lamont Dozier
Albums recorded at Hitsville U.S.A.